No Man's Land is the eighth studio album by English singer-songwriter Frank Turner, released on 16 August 2019 by Xtra Mile Recordings.

It is a concept album with songs about women from history, often with connections to music.

Background
The album was announced alongside the release of the single "Sister Rosetta" on July 3, 2019. Turner wrote the album as a way of drawing attention to the lives of "fascinating women" whose amazing lives were overlooked due to their gender. These women include Byzantine princess Kassiani, Huda Sha'arawi, Nannie Doss, Nica Rothschild, Sister Rosetta Tharpe, Jinny Bingham, Dora Hand and the CPR training manikin Resusci Anne. Alongside the album's release, Turner and Somethin' Else released a podcast entitled "Tales From No Man's Land" in which he discusses the story of every woman that the songs are based on. The album also features a new recording of the song "Silent Key" previously released on Turner's sixth album "Positive Songs for Negative People."

Reception

The album received generally favorable reviews with an aggregate score of 63/100 on Metacritic. Many praised Turner's return to folk instead of the indie pop sound of his previous album "Be More Kind." However, the idea of the album saw much controversy and the album received incredibly negative reviews from publishers such as The Independent and NME. The Independent described the album as "extreme mansplaining" and criticised the instrumentation as being "plodding" and Turner's limited vocal range being incredibly evident. NME stated that the album was too similar to Turner's previous work, leading to the voices of the woman involved being completely overshadowed. The Mic, however, argued that No Man's Land succeeded as an "astoundingly versatile and sensitive" concept album, noting that "overwhelmingly Turner opts for well realised curveballs as opposed to safe and unadventurous folk music".

Track listing

Personnel
Adapted from Allmusic.

Frank Turner – lead vocals, acoustic guitar, electric guitar, bass guitar, mandolin, percussion, piano, synthesiser

Additional musicians
Netty Brown – trumpet
Jeff Dazey – saxophone
Andrea Goldsworthy – upright bass
Jessica Guise – backing vocals
Rio Hellyer – vocal arrangements
Carol Jarvis – trombone
Anna Jenkins – violin, viola
Marianne Johnson – vocal arrangements
Holly Madge – drums
Kat Marsh – vocal arrangements
Clare McInerney – clarinet
Matt Nasir – string arrangements
Rebecca Need-Menear – vocal arrangements
Kate Pavil – vocal arrangements
Lionicio Saenz – trumpet
Gill Sandell – accordion, piano
Jo Silverston – cello
Rachel Still – vocal arrangements
Eleanor Tinlin – vocal arrangements
Julia Webb – vocal arrangements

Production
Catherine Marks – production, mixing
Frank Arkwright – mastering
Grace Banks – engineering
Adam "Cecil" Bartlett – engineer

Additional personnel
Richard Andrews – design
Olivia M Healy – illustrations
Richard O'Donovan – A&R

Charts

References

2019 albums
Concept albums
Frank Turner albums
Xtra Mile Recordings albums